Wilhelm Thiele (1890–1975) was an Austrian screenwriter and film director. He directed over 40 films between 1921 and 1960.

Life and career 
Thiele started his show career as a stage actor. He got his start in Austrian and German film during the 1920s, most often as a director of film comedies. His biggest success was the highly influential musical film The Three from the Filling Station (1930), the highest-grossing film in Germany that year. Thiele, who was of Jewish descent, left Germany during the Nazi Era. His first film in Hollywood, Lottery Lover in 1935, was without success and Thiele never achieved the same level of fame in Hollywood as he had Germany. He mostly made B-Pictures, but is credited with giving actress Dorothy Lamour her big start in movies with The Jungle Princess (1936). In the 1950s, he worked as a director in American television. His last two films were made in Germany: The Last Pedestrian (1960) and Sabine und die hundert Männer (1960).

Wilhelm Thiele was married and had three children. His younger brother was the director Eugen Thiele.

Partial filmography

 The Last Waltz King (1922)
 Fiat Lux (1923)
 Tales of Old Vienna (1923)
 Franz Lehár (1923)
 Two Children (1924)
 The Island of Dreams (1925)
 Fire of Love (1925)
 The Little Variety Star (1926)
 His Toughest Case (1926)
 Countess Ironing-Maid (1926)
 Eva and the Grasshopper (1927)
 The Csardas Princess (1927)
 His Late Excellency (1927)
 Orient Express (1927)
 Attorney for the Heart (1927)
 Hurrah! I Live! (1928)
 The Lady with the Mask (1928)
 The Model from Montparnasse (1929)
 Waltz of Love (1930)
 The Three from the Filling Station (1930)
 The Road to Paradise (1930)
 Waltz of Love (1930)
 The Private Secretary (1931)
 The Typist (1931)
 The Girl and the Boy (1931)
 Two Hearts Beat as One (1932)
 Madame Makes Her Exit (1932)
 Girls to Marry (1932)
 Marry Me (1932)
 Amourous Adventure (1932)
 Grand Duchess Alexandra (1933)
 Waltz Time (1933)
 The Lottery Lover (1935)
 The Jungle Princess (1936)
 London by Night (1937)
 Tarzan Triumphs (1943)
 Tarzan's Desert Mystery (1943)
 The Du Pont Story (1950)
 The Last Pedestrian (1960)
  (1960)

References

External links

1890 births
1975 deaths
Austrian Jews
Film people from Vienna
Austrian film directors
Austrian male screenwriters
Burials at Hollywood Forever Cemetery
Jewish emigrants from Nazi Germany to the United States
20th-century Austrian screenwriters
20th-century Austrian male writers